Latium was the region of ancient Italy in which Rome was situated.

Latium may also refer to:
Old Latium (Latium vetus), the most ancient section of Latium, tribal area of the Latini
Latium adiectum, a territory added to Latium vetus by Roman conquest
Ius Latium, a rule of law applicable to magistrates in ancient Latium
Latin Settlement, communities in Texas founded by German refugees
Latium, Texas, a German settlement in Texas
Latium (1669), a scholarly work by Athanasius Kircher

See also
 Lazio, the modern Italian Region comprising (but not limited to) Latium